Damai is a caste within the Khas people in Nepal and India.

Damai may also refer to:
Miji people, group found in Arunachal Pradesh, India, also known as Damai
Damai.cn, a Chinese ticketing website
Damai Center, an indoor arena in China
Damai Secondary School, a school in Singapore

See also
Damai LRT station (disambiguation)
Jalan Damai, Singapore